Suva Adventist College is a coeducational Christian secondary school in Suva, Fiji, established in  1993.

See also
List of Seventh-day Adventist secondary schools

References

External links
Suva Adventist College - Adventist Yearbook

SAC
SAC
SAC
1993 establishments in Fiji